Pirogovo is a rural locality (a village) in Gryazovetskoye Rural Settlement, Gryazovetsky District, Vologda Oblast, Russia. The population was 206 as of 2002. There are 7 streets.

Geography 
Pirogovo is located 2 km north of Gryazovets (the district's administrative centre) by road. Gryazovets is the nearest rural locality.

References 

Rural localities in Gryazovetsky District